Sebastes schlegelii, also known as the Korean rockfish, Northern black seaperch, and Black rockfish, is a predatory species of marine ray-finned fish belonging to the subfamily Sebastinae, the rockfishes, part of the family Scorpaenidae It is found in the Northwest Pacific Ocean.

Taxonomy
Sebastes schlegeli  was first formally described in 1880 by the German zoologist and paleontologist Franz Martin Hilgendorf with the type locality given as Tokyo and Hakodate in Japan. Some authorities place this species in the subgenus Acutomentum, of which it is the type species. The specific name honours the German ornithologist and herpetologist Hermann Schlegel, who, cowrote Fauna Japonica with Coenraad Jacob Temminck in which they reported this species as S. inermis.

Distribution
The species is found in the Northwest Pacific Ocean, off China, the Korean Peninsula and Japan.

Description
S. schlegelii are blackish with black pelvic, anal and caudal fins. The seaperch has a total of 8 weak head spines. It is black when young and turns a mottled gray on the sides with age, often nearing white. This species can vary greatly in size between bodies of water.

Reproduction
S. schlegelii is ovoviviparous and breed via internal fertilization, females storing sperm until the development of the eggs. The phases between the start of the process and the end are separated by several months. The majority of the young are reared in late winter to early spring. Females produce between 125,000 and 1,200,000 eggs every breeding season. However it has been noted that not all of the eggs are released every year. It has been occasionally observed that the female may absorb the eggs back into her system.

Along with other close related Sebastes species in the Northwest Pacific Ocean, a duplicated copy of the amh gene (called amhy)  is the master sex-determining gene for S. schlegelii. In vitro experiments demonstrate that the overexpression of amhy causes female-to-male sex reversal in S. schlegelii.

Ecology
It is a pelagic fish, occurring on the continental shelf. Like other pelagic fish, they spend most of their time amid the water columns and are generally associated with rougher terrain. Juveniles are often associated with rafts of seaweed. 

Lepeophtheirus elegans is a species of sea lice reported on S. schlegelii.

Fishery
They make up an important component of nearshore fisheries in northern Asia. The preference of the species for rough terrain can make it somewhat inconvenient for commercial fisheries, which are often situated in nearshore, shallow water, and rocky areas (reefs). The species is a popular quarry for recreational anglers.

References

schlegelii
Fish of Japan
Fish of Russia
Fish of China
Taxa named by Franz Martin Hilgendorf
Fish of the Pacific Ocean
Fish described in 1880